Madeline Carroll (born March 18, 1996) is an American actress known for starring as Juli Baker in Flipped, as Molly Johnson in Swing Vote, as Farren in The Spy Next Door, and as Willow O'Neil in The Magic of Belle Isle.

Early life
Carroll was born and raised in Los Angeles. Her mother is a homemaker and her father is a contractor. She has three brothers: Ned, Jack and Dylan. She began modeling at the age of three. At the age of four, she was discovered by her theatrical agent 'Wendy' in a nail shop in Sherman Oaks. She began her career appearing in numerous commercials for companies such as Allstate, Chef Boyardee, Kmart, Mr. Clean, Subway, Super 8 Motels and Target Corporation.

Career

Her first appearance in a film was in the 2006 horror film When a Stranger Calls. After minor roles in The Santa Clause 3: The Escape Clause and Resident Evil: Extinction, in 2008 she got her first major role co-starring in Swing Vote alongside Kevin Costner. In 2010 she appeared in the Jackie Chan film The Spy Next Door. That same year she also starred in the film adaptation of Wendelin Van Draanen's novel, Flipped, directed by Rob Reiner. Carroll's performance in the film garnered critical acclaim, and in 2011 and 2012 she appeared in numerous other movies such as Mr. Popper's Penguins, Machine Gun Preacher, and The Magic of Belle Isle.

Around age 15, Carroll began to be offered nude or promiscuous roles, all of which she turned down due to her personal beliefs. In 2014, also due to personal reasons, she turned down a larger role in the show Scandal, in which she had already appeared in two episodes. When she was 19, she nearly gave up being an actress altogether after a call from her agent, who stated that it was impossible to be a Hollywood actress without taking nude roles. Later, she related the following:

The next day, she was offered a role in the Christian film God Bless the Broken Road. Since then, she has played roles in other faith-based films, including I Can Only Imagine and Pure Flix's Indivisible, both of which were released in 2018.

In 2019, Carroll received the Golden Angel for "Excellent Young Performing Artist of U.S." at the 15th Chinese American Film Festival in Los Angeles.

Subsequent to starring in the Erwin Brothers' I Can Only Imagine, Carroll became involved with their studio Kingdom Story Company, with the purpose of learning filmmaking. She, Jon Erwin, and Jon Gunn wrote the script of Kingdom's first production and Carroll's screenwriting debut, I Still Believe, which was released in March 2020.

Personal life
Carroll is a devout Christian, and often speaks about her faith at religious events and conferences, and during interviews.

Filmography

Film

Television

References

External links

 
 

1996 births
21st-century American actresses
Actresses from Los Angeles
American child actresses
American Christians
American expatriate actresses in the United Kingdom
American film actresses
American television actresses
Living people